Eruvatti  is a census town in Thalassery taluk of Kannur district in the Indian state of Kerala.

Demographics
As of 2011 Census, Eruvatti had a population of 16,905 with 7,769 (46%) males and 9,136 (54%) females. Average male female sex ratio was 1176 higher than the state average of 1084. In Eruvatti, 9.4% of the population was under 6 years of age. Eruvatti had an average literacy of 97% higher than the state average of 94%; male literacy was 98.2% and female literacy was 96%.

Religion
As of 2011 census, Eruvatti census town had total population of 16,905 among which 14,413 (85.26%) are Hindus, 2,345 (13.87%) are Muslims and 0.87% others.

Administration
Eruvatti census town is part of Pinarayi Grama Panchayat in Thalassery Block Panchayat. Eruvatti is politically part of Dharmadam (State Assembly constituency) under Kannur Loksabha constituency.

References

Cities and towns in Kannur district
Villages near Kuthuparamba